Princess Alicia of Bourbon-Parma (Alicia Maria Teresa Francesca Luisa Pia Anna Valeria; 13 November 1917 – 28 March 2017) was a Spanish infanta. A member of the House of Bourbon-Parma, she became Duchess of Calabria through her marriage to Infante Alfonso, Duke of Calabria. She occasionally undertook official duties on behalf of the Spanish monarchy. Through marriage, she was the maternal half-aunt of King Juan Carlos I of Spain. She was the longest-lived Infanta of Spain.

Early life
Princess Alicia of Bourbon-Parma was born in Vienna, Austria-Hungary. She was the seventh child and fourth daughter of Prince Elias of Bourbon-Parma and Archduchess Maria Anna of Austria. As a grandchild of Robert I, Duke of Parma, she was the paternal first cousin of Tsar Boris III of Bulgaria, and the paternal half-first cousin of Jean, Grand Duke of Luxembourg, Otto, Crown Prince of Austria and Queen Anne of Romania. From the age of 5, Alicia accompanied her father hunting in the family estates of Austria. She received her first hunting trophy, the Glasshatte, at the age of 12.

Marriage and issue
On 16 April 1936, she married  Prince Alfonso of Bourbon-Two Sicilies, Infante of Spain, nephew of ex-King Alfonso XIII of Spain, at the Minoritenkirche in Vienna. She would have become Queen of Spain if her husband's uncle had not had children. They had three children:

 Princess Teresa of Bourbon-Two Sicilies, Duchess of Salerno (6 February 1937); she married Iñigo Moreno y Arteaga, 12th Marquess of Laula, on 16 April 1961, had issue.
 Infante Carlos, Duke of Calabria (16 January 1938 – 5 October 2015); he married Princess Anne of Orléans on 11 May 1965, had issue. Succeeded his father as a claimant. 
 Princess Inés of Bourbon-Two Sicilies, Duchess of Syracuse (18 February 1940); she married Don Luis de Morales y Aguado on 21 January 1965, had issue.

The couple settled first in Prépinson, south of Paris, and then in Lausanne, where their three children were born. In 1941, the couple settled in Spain and acquired La Toledana, an estate in Ciudad Real. In the 1950s and 60s, La Toledana became a meeting point for high society and European royalty. She was a pigeon shooting champion and was the only woman who hunted all the larger fauna in Spain. She founded the Flor de Lis company, which introduced canine species in Spain, such as the Teckel or the Deutsch Drathaar, whose breeding brought them succulent benefits.

Later life
Alicia was widowed in 1964. She became a stubborn advocate of her son's claims to the titles of "Duke of Calabria" and his position as head of the House of Bourbon-Two Sicilies. She outlived her son by two years.  

Despite not filing any claims about her "rights", she was considered by some to be the lawful queen of Navarre.

She died on 28 March 2017 in Madrid, Spain, at the age of 99. King Felipe VI ordered the royal guard to watch over her coffin, which was draped with the Spanish flag. As an Infanta of Spain, she had the right to be buried in the Pantheon of the Princes at El Escorial. However, she was buried in the pantheon of the House of Bourbon-Parma in Austria, per her wishes. King Felipe VI and Queen Letizia, former King Juan Carlos and Queen Sofía attended her funeral at El Escorial.

Honours
  : 1190th Dame of the Order of Queen Maria Luisa – 
 Dame Grand Cross of Justice of the Sacred Military Constantinian Order of Saint George (1960). –

Arms

Ancestry

References 

1917 births
2017 deaths
Nobility from Vienna
Spanish infantas
Princesses of Bourbon-Two Sicilies
Princesses of Bourbon-Parma
Austrian Roman Catholics
Duchesses of Calabria
20th-century Roman Catholics
21st-century Roman Catholics
Pretenders